McGee Creek Reservoir is a reservoir in Atoka County, Oklahoma. It impounds the waters of McGee Creek and several smaller streams, including Potapo,  Panther, Little Bugaboo, Bear, Blue, Mill, and Crooked creeks, all of which are tributaries of Muddy Boggy River. According to the Bureau of Reclamation (BuRec), the reservoir was designed to extend  up McGee Creek and  up Potapo Creek when the water is at "conservation level.

McGee Creek Lake is bordered by the McGee Creek Wildlife Management Area, the McGee Creek Natural State Scenic Recreation Area, and McGee Creek State Park.  The combined effect of these protected lands is to afford the area the same rural and isolated nature it has always known.

Description

Reservoir

Dam and river outlet
A riprap blanket prevents erosion of the upstream sides of both the dam and the dike. The river outlet works located on the east side of the dam release water to McGee Creek under extreme conditions.

Municipal water outlet
Water from the lake is routinely pumped to municipal consumers via pipeline. The municipal outlet works has a bypass that diverts  directly downstream to McGee Creek. This provides a constant stream of water that is beneficial to marine life. The river outlet works, located on the east side of the dam, handle this function. A separate intake leads to three conduits (each  diameter), which terminate in a stilling basin, that has a single pipe leading to the three variable-capacity centrifugal discharge pumps. Other pumps then transfer the water to Oklahoma City.

History
The McGee Creek Project and McGee Creek Authority were established in 1978 to develop and maintain the McGee Creek Reservoir to provide a municipal and industrial water supply for areas in central and southern Oklahoma, including Oklahoma City and Atoka County. Under the direct supervision of superintendent Glen Russell, the authority has operated and maintained the reservoir and associated facilities, including an attached water pipeline, a surge tank, a regulating tank, a maintenance complex, and land easements surrounding these facilities. The U.S. Department of Interior, Bureau of Reclamation owns the reservoir, but has granted McGee Creek Authority ownership title to the project office, aqueduct and appurtenances, and other operation and maintenance related facilities.

Notes

References 

Protected areas of Atoka County, Oklahoma
Reservoirs in Oklahoma
Buildings and structures in Atoka County, Oklahoma
Dams in Oklahoma
United States Bureau of Reclamation dams
Dams completed in 1987
Bodies of water of Atoka County, Oklahoma